Kurudu is an Eastern Yapen language of the Malayo-Polynesian languages, in Papua Province of Western New Guinea, northeastern Indonesia. 

It is spoken by the people in Kurudu Island, located in Cenderawasih Bay between Serui Island of the Yapen Islands, and the New Guinea mainland.

References

South Halmahera–West New Guinea languages
Languages of western New Guinea
Cenderawasih Bay
Papua (province) culture